Pooja Gor (born 1 June 1991) is an Indian television actress. She is best known for her role of Pratigya in Mann Kee Awaaz Pratigya. In 2014, she participated in the reality show Fear Factor: Khatron Ke Khiladi 5.

Early life
Pooja Gor was born on 1 June 1991 in Ahmedabad, Gujarat. In 2015, Gor learned kickboxing for self defence and to stay physically fit.

Career

Television 

Gor began her television career in 2009 with a supporting role in Imagine TV's romance Kitani Mohabbat Hai alongside Karan Kundra and Kritika Kamra. She played the role of Purvi, the sister-in-law of the female lead Aarohi (played by Kamra). The show, which premiered in January 2009, culminated in September that year.

Later that year, Gor was cast opposite Arhaan Behll in the Star Plus soap Mann Kee Awaaz Pratigya, where she played Pratigya. The show went off air in 2012 after a good run of 3 years.

In 2013, Gor appeared in two episodes of Life OK's episodic horror series Ek Thhi Naayka opposite Vishal Gandhi. In the same year, she played an episodic role in another episodic romantic series Yeh Hai Aashiqui alongside Sehban Azim. She also made a special appearance in the finale of the reality show Bigg Boss 6.

From 2013 to 2015, Gor hosted Life OK's crime drama Savdhaan India. In 2014, she participated in Colors TV's reality-stunt series Fear Factor: Khatron Ke Khiladi 5 where she became the first contestant to be eliminated or evicted. That year, she also appeared in Box Cricket League. In 2015, she starred opposite Sahil Anand as Roshni, a doctor, in Life OK's medical series Ek Nayi Ummeed - Roshni.

In 2016, she played an episodic role in Pyar Tune Kya Kiya. In 2019, Gor participated in Colors TV's Kitchen Champion 5 along with Abigail Jain. In 2021, Gor reprise her role Pratigya in Mann Kee Awaaz Pratigya 2 along with Arhaan Behll.

Film
In 2018, Gor made her film debut with the Abhishek Kapoor-directed inter-faith romance Kedarnath, co-starring Sushant Singh Rajput and newcomer Sara Ali Khan. She portrayed Brinda Mishra in the film.

Personal life 
Gor has been in an relationship with TV actor Raj Singh Arora since 2009. In December 2020, Gor announced their separation  on Instagram.

Filmography

Films

Television

Web

References

External links

 
  
 

21st-century Indian actresses
Living people
Indian television actresses
Actresses from Ahmedabad
Actresses from Mumbai
Indian soap opera actresses
1991 births
Actresses in Hindi television
Fear Factor: Khatron Ke Khiladi participants